Arie Andries Kruithof (1909 in Zeist (NL) – 1993 in Son en Breugel (NL)) was a Dutch professor of applied physics at Eindhoven University of Technology (Netherlands). Kruithof studied physics at Utrecht University, where he obtained a doctor’s degree from Leonard Ornstein in 1934. At Philips, he did research on lighting systems, especially gas-discharge lamps. Later he was appointed professor of applied physics at Eindhoven University of Technology, leading the Atomic Physics group, mainly researching gas discharges and plasmas. The Kruithof curve, describing the influence of colour temperature on visual perception, is named after him.

References

External links 
 

1909 births
1993 deaths
20th-century Dutch physicists
Utrecht University alumni
Academic staff of the Eindhoven University of Technology
People from Zeist